Dokdo Volunteer Garrison (Korean: 독도의용수비대) was a South Korean paramilitary outpost on the islands of Liancourt Rocks, which are called Dokdo in Korean. South Korea and Japan each claim sovereignty over them. South Korea maintained the garrison from 1953 to 1956.

In 2017, plans to upgrade the outpost to a more military basis caused tension between South Korea and Japan.

History 
On April 20, 1953, work began to create a garrison on the islands. Completed on December 30, 1956, it was handed over to the National Police. Hong Soon-chil and other veterans of the Korean War, who returned to Ulleung Island after participating in the South Korean armed forces volunteer service and fought in the Korean War, made up the garrison. It was a private organization that has laid the foundation for Korea to exercise territorial sovereignty over the islands.

Organization 
Captain Hong Soon-chul selected his troops, having regard to their combat experience, bravery, age, personality, and family situation.

Organization motivation 

Japan regained its sovereignty after the allied Occupation of Japan post-World War II, through the San Francisco Peace Treaty. However, the Korean War made it difficult for Korea to focus on protecting the island when there were more pressing matters on the peninsula. Starting in 1953, Japan began to assert their claims to Liancourt Rocks. 

After returning to Ulleungdo at the end of the war, Captain Hong Soon-chul did not return to protect the Liancourt Rocks. Hong knew that it was difficult to send troops after the war. (Hong had previously been one of the soldiers in the garrison stationed on the islands.)

Beginning (to 1953) 
Since April 1953, talks had been underway to normalize relations between Korea and Japan. At the same time, the sovereignty over Liancourt Rocks was raised. In addition, Japanese ships, fishing boats, and training ships frequently appeared near the islands. South Korea recognized this to be a threat to fishing, an important means of livelihood of Ulleungdo residents.

Development (from 1954) 
The Japanese coast guard dispatched a patrol boat to Liancourt Rocks. Several warning signs were deployed on the islands in May and July 1953, warning them to not approach the islands. On October 23, Japan installed their own territorial landmarks on the islands replacing the South Korean ones. The Dokdo Volunteer Garrison was formed on April 20, 1953, led by Hong Soon-chil, due to the ongoing situation, to carry out security duties.

Finish (to 1956) 
On December 30, 1956, the Dokdo Volunteer Garrison handed over security work and equipment to the police, ending official garrison activity. However, nine Dokdo Volunteer Garrison members were assigned to the Ulleung Island police station as police officers and took charge of guard duty.

Support

The South Korean state provides support for the members of the Dokdo Volunteer Garrison and survivors who have made special sacrifices to defend Liancourt Rocks.
 Payment: the spouses of the members of the Garrison and the deceased receive a pension from the government
 National cemetery: the Dokdo Volunteer Garrison cemetery in Daejeon National Cemetery
 Payment as compensation for the death of members of the Garrison and their spouses
 A national day commemorating the Garrison
 The month of the Patriotic Veterans, and the Day of Comfort
 Invitation to a consolation event

Assessment 
In 1966, the South Korean government evaluated the achievements of the Dokdo Volunteer Garrison. It awarded Hong Soon-chil, the captain, a Work Merit Award. Eleven members were awarded a Defense Certificate. Dr. Yoo Ha-young of the Northeast Asian History Foundation said, "Above all, the presence of the Dokdo Volunteer Garrison has contributed to the exercise of national jurisdiction over Liancourt Rocks and the protection of the nation's territory."

References

Liancourt Rocks
Law enforcement in South Korea
1953 establishments in South Korea
1956 disestablishments in Asia